The  is an AC (20 kV 50 Hz single-phase)/DC (1,500 V) dual-voltage electric multiple unit (EMU) train type operated on local services by East Japan Railway Company (JR East) in Japan since December 1995.

Design

Formations

10-car sets
As of 1 October 2018, four ten-car sets (K701–K704) are based at Katsuta Depot and formed with four motored ("M") cars and six non-powered trailer ("T") cars.

 Cars 3 and 8 each have one single-arm pantograph.
 Cars 1 and 10 have a wheelchair space.
 Cars 1 and 10 each have a universal design toilet.
 Car 8 is designated as a mildly air-conditioned car.

5-car sets
As of 1 October 2018, four five-car sets (K751–K754) are based at Katsuta Depot and formed with two motored ("M") cars and three non-powered trailer ("T") cars.

 Cars 3 has one single-arm pantograph.
 Cars 1 and 5 have a wheelchair space.
 Cars 1 has a universal design toilet.
 Car 4 is designated as a mildly air-conditioned car.

Interior

History
The first 10+5-car train was originally scheduled to be delivered in time for entry into service from the March 1995 timetable revision, but deliveries from Kawasaki Heavy Industries in Kobe were delayed until May due to the effects of the Great Hanshin earthquake in January of that year. The first trains ultimately entered revenue service from the start of the 1 December 1995 timetable revision.

Between September and October 2006, modifications were made to the side windows to allow some windows to be opened. Between 2011 and 2012, the fleet underwent a life-extension refurbishment programme, which involved replacing electrical and brake equipment. These trains were originally equipped with Siemens GTO-VVVF propulsion systems, which were similar to the Keikyu 2100 series and also produced a "do-re-mi-fa-so-la-ti-do" scale when starting up. As part of the refurbishment, the propulsion system was changed to Toshiba IGBT-VVVF. 

Between December 2014 and December 2015, all PS29 lozenge-type pantographs were replaced with single-arm pantographs.

Build details
The build details for the fleet are as shown below.

References

Further reading

External links

 JR East E501 series 

Electric multiple units of Japan
East Japan Railway Company
Train-related introductions in 1995
20 kV AC multiple units
1500 V DC multiple units of Japan
Kawasaki multiple units
Tokyu Car multiple units